Sydney Chamber Opera is an opera company based in Sydney, Australia. It is a resident company at Carriageworks. The company was founded in 2010 by Louis Garrick and Jack Symonds. Its first production was in February 2011 and has since produced between two and four twentieth and twenty-first century chamber operas each year. Its repertoire typically consists of world premieres of Australian operas and recent international works receiving their Australian premieres, including stagings of song cycles or non-traditional stage works.

History and repertoire 
Sydney Chamber Opera began with the world premiere of Notes from Underground by Jack Symonds and Pierce Wilcox, an adaptation of Dostoevsky’s novel at the Cellblock Theatre, Darlinghurst. The Cunning Little Vixen, The Lighthouse, Owen Wingrave, Exil, His Music Burns, Mayakovsky, Fly Away Peter, An Index of Metals and O Mensch! were presented at Carriageworks and I Have Had Enough, In the Penal Colony and Climbing Toward Midnight at National Institute of Dramatic Art. Through The Gates was a performance for the 18th Biennale of Sydney at Pier 2/3 Walsh Bay amidst a large-scale installation by Belgian artist  and Victory Over the Sun was another site-specific commission by the 20th Biennale of Sydney for performance on Cockatoo Island, reimagining an early-twentieth century Futurist work with Western Sydney artist Justene Williams. His Music Burns, Passion and O Mensch!, and Biographica were presented in the 2014, 2016 & 2017 Sydney Festivals. Passion was a revival of a production by Pierre Audi. Fly Away Peter toured to Arts Centre Melbourne in association with Melbourne Festival in October 2015,  and in 2018 the previous year's production of The Rape of Lucretia was co-presented by Victorian Opera and Tasmanian Symphony Orchestra at the Dark Mofo Festival.

2011–2015 
WP= World premiere; AP= Australian premiere

 Notes from Underground (Jack Symonds / Pierce Wilcox) – WP dir. Netta Yashchin (2011)
 The Cunning Little Vixen (Leoš Janáček arr. Jonathan Dove) – AP dir. Kate Gaul (2011)
 I Have Had Enough (JS Bach / Jack Symonds) – WP (Symonds) dir. Kip Williams (2011)
 In the Penal Colony (Philip Glass / Rudolph Wurlitzer) – AP dir. Imara Savage (2012)
 Through The Gates (various songs by Bach, Barber, Debussy, Mahler, Poulenc, Shostakovich et al.) dir. Kip Williams (2012)
 The Lighthouse (Peter Maxwell Davies) dir. Kip Williams (2012)
 Climbing Toward Midnight (Jack Symonds / Richard Wagner) – WP dir. Netta Yashchin (2013)
 Owen Wingrave (Benjamin Britten / Myfanwy Piper) – AP dir. Imara Savage (2013)
 Exil (Giya Kancheli) – AP dir. Adena Jacobs (2013)
 ...pas à pas – nulle part...  (György Kurtág / Samuel Beckett) – AP dir. Sarah Giles (2014)
 Into the Little Hill (George Benjamin / Martin Crimp) – AP dir. Sarah Giles (2014)
 Mayakovsky (Michael Smetanin / Alison Croggon) – WP dir. Kat Henry (2014)
 Fly Away Peter (Elliott Gyger / Pierce Wilcox) – WP dir. Imara Savage (2015)
 An Index of Metals (Fausto Romitelli / Kenka Lekovich) – AP dir. Kip Williams (2015)

2016 
 Passion (Pascal Dusapin / Rita de Letteriis) – AP dir. Pierre Audi (revival dir. Miranda Lakerveld)
 O Mensch! (Pascal Dusapin / Friedrich Nietzsche) – AP dir. Sarah Giles
 Victory Over the Sun (Huw Belling / Pierce Wilcox) – WP dir. Justene Williams/ Pierce Wilcox
 Notes from Underground (Jack Symonds / Pierce Wilcox) – WP new version dir. Patrick Nolan

2017 
 Biographica (Mary Finsterer / Tom Wright)  – WP dir. Janice Muller
 The Rape of Lucretia (Benjamin Britten / Ronald Duncan) dir. Kip Williams

2018 
 The Howling Girls (Damien Ricketson) – WP dir. Adena Jacobs
 Resonant Bodies Festival (featuring Sofia Jernberg, Rully Shabara, Deborah Kayser, Sonya Holowell, Mitchell Riley and Ariadne Greif)

2019 
 La Passion de Simone (Kaija Saariaho, Amin Maalouf) with Jane Sheldon, soprano; Jack Symonds, conductor – AP directed by Imara Savage
Oscar and Lucinda (Elliot Gyger / Pierce Wilcox) with Jack Symonds, conductor; Patrick Nolan, director

2020 

 Breaking Glass (Georgia Scott / Peggy Polias / Josephine Macken /  Bree van Reyk) - WP with Jack Symonds, conductor; Danielle Maas & Clemence Williams, directors

2021 

 Future Remains (Leoš Janáček / Huw Belling & Pierce Wilcox) - WP with Alexander Berlage, director

Key personnel 
Jack Symonds is the Artistic Director.

Huw Belling is Principal Artistic Associate. Danielle Maas, Mitchell Riley, Jane Sheldon, James Wannan and Pierce Wilcox are Artistic Associates.

The company has typically engaged stage directors from a theatre background, often making their operatic debut, e.g. Sydney Theatre Company artistic director Kip Williams. The company has also been noted for developing talented young singers.

References

External links 
 
 Carriageworks

Australian opera companies
Music in Sydney
2010 establishments in Australia
Musical groups established in 2010
Performing groups established in 2010